Mary Margret Meyers (later Berger, later Rothstein, born February 10, 1946) is an American speed skater who competed in the 1968 Winter Olympics.

She was born in Saint Paul, Minnesota.

In 1968 she won the silver medal in the 500 metres event.

References 
 

1946 births
Living people
Speed skaters at the 1968 Winter Olympics
Olympic silver medalists for the United States in speed skating
American female speed skaters
Medalists at the 1968 Winter Olympics